"Little Miss Muffet" is an English nursery rhyme of uncertain origin, first recorded in 1805.  It has a Roud Folk Song Index number of 20605.

Wording

The rhyme first appeared in print in Songs for the Nursery (1805),  and there have been many variants since. The Oxford Dictionary of Nursery Rhymes gives the following:
Little Miss Muffet
Sat on a tuffet,
Eating her curds and whey;
There came a big spider,
Who sat down beside her
And frightened Miss Muffet away.

Older versions sometimes use "of" rather than "her" in line 3, and refer to a "little spider" as in this example dating between 1837 and 1845:

Little Miss Muffet
She sat on a tuffet,
Eating of curds and whey;
There came a little spider,
Who sat down beside her,
And frighten'd Miss Muffet away.

There are several early-published versions with significant variations including "Little Mary Ester sat upon a tester" (1812) and "Little Miss Mopsey, Sat in the shopsey" (1842). Other collected variants have included "Little Miss Muffet, sat on a toffet" (1830s?) and "Little Miss Muffet, sat on a buffet" (1840s?). In a later United States example, "whey" was replaced with "pie".

"Tuffet"

Although the word "tuffet" is now sometimes used to mean a type of low seat, the word in the rhyme probably refers to a grassy hillock, small knoll or mound (a variant spelling of an obsolete and rare meaning of "tuft"). The Oxford English Dictionary calls the "hassock or footstool" meaning "doubtful", and "perhaps due to misunderstanding of the nursery rhyme".

Origins
The origins of the rhyme are unclear. Although no record has been found before 1805, Iona and Peter Opie argue that it is likely to be considerably older given its similarity to other rhymes such as "Little Polly Flinders", "Little Poll Parrot", "Little Tommy Tacket", "Little General Monk" and "Little Jack Horner" (the last known to have been current at least as early as 1720). It is possible that all of these rhymes, and others, are parodies of whichever unknown rhyme came first.

It is sometimes claimed – without evidence – that the original Miss Muffet was Patience, daughter of Dr Thomas Muffet (d.1604), an English physician and entomologist, but the Opies are sceptical given the two-hundred year gap between his death and the rhyme's appearance. It has also been claimed to refer to Mary, Queen of Scots (1543–1587), frightened by the religious reformer John Knox (1510–1572).

Cultural depictions 

Several novels and films, including the Alex Cross novel Along Came a Spider (1993) and its eponymous 2001 film adaptation, take their titles from the poem's crucial line.

See also

 Arachnophobia
 Cultural depictions of spiders
 Itsy Bitsy Spider

References

External links

English nursery rhymes
Fictional spiders
Songs about fictional female characters
Songs about spiders
English folk songs
English children's songs
Traditional children's songs
Year of song unknown
Songwriter unknown